tmge may refer to:

 Thee Michelle Gun Elephant, a Japanese garage rock band
 TMEIC GE, an industrial automation company
 Tetramethylgermanium or TMGe